Edward Silsby Farrington (September 6, 1856 – August 31, 1929) was a United States district judge of the United States District Court for the District of Nevada.

Education and career

Born in Yreka, California, Farrington received an Artium Baccalaureus degree from Amherst College in 1880 and attended the University of California, Hastings College of the Law. He was in private practice in Elko, Nevada from 1886 to 1907.

Federal judicial service

On December 19, 1906, Farrington was nominated by President Theodore Roosevelt to a seat on the United States District Court for the District of Nevada vacated by Judge Thomas Porter Hawley. Farrington was confirmed by the United States Senate on January 10, 1907, and received his commission the same day. He assumed senior status on April 30, 1928, serving in that capacity until his death on August 31, 1929.

References

Sources
 

1856 births
1929 deaths
People from Yreka, California
Judges of the United States District Court for the District of Nevada
United States district court judges appointed by Theodore Roosevelt
20th-century American judges
Amherst College alumni
University of California, Hastings College of the Law alumni
People from Elko, Nevada